The Ad-Dharmi is a Schedule Caste Sect in the state of Punjab in India Ad-Dharmis are 11.48% of the Schedule Castes in Punjab.

Origin
The Ad-Dharm movement was started in 1920s, for the purpose of getting a distinct religious identity same as Adi Dravida movement of Tamil Nadu. The founder of the Ad-Dharm Movement was Mangu Ram Mugowalia (founding member of Ghadar Party), Master Gurbanta Singh (senior Congress leader) B. L. Gherra and also Pandit Hari Ram (Pandori Bibi) who was the secretary of the organization.

The movement projected Guru Ravidas, the 14th century Bhakti Movement saint as their spiritual guru and a sacred book Ad Parkash for separate ritual traditions. The Ad-Dharmi Dalits came together as a faith was in 1925 when the British ruled India.

In the 1931 census, more than 450,000 registered themselves as members of the new indigenous faith called Ad Dharam (or Original Religion). But this faith and movement vanished after India's independence because of major concentration of its leader into state politics and government's reservation policy only for low-caste from Hindu, Sikh and Buddhist communities.

Religion
Although the Ad-Dharmi are followers of Guru Ravidas (now Ravidassia religion), as they regard Amritbani Guru Ravidass Ji as their religious text. After killing of Ramananda Dass on Vienna triggered them a lot and they formed separate Amritbani and customs.

Each of their settlement contains a gurdwaras and Ravidas Bhawans, which are both a centre of worship and as well as a focus of the community.

Notable people 
Mangu Ram Mugowalia, founding member of Ghadar Movement and Ad Dharm movement in Punjab

See also
Chamar
Ramdasia
Ravidassia religion

References

Hindu new religious movements
Hindu denominations
Ravidassia
Vaishnavism
Social groups of Punjab, India
Punjabi tribes
Dalit communities